Danielle Hampton is a Canadian television, theatre and film actress.

In 2004 she starred as a regular cast member in the nationally televised soap opera Paradise Falls, playing the role of Charlene "Charlie" Piercy. In the same year she was also in the cast of Metropia playing Jordan. In 2005 she made guest appearances in Show Me Yours. Previous TV guest appearances include Kevin Hill (2004), Odyssey 5 (2002), and Code Name: Eternity.

Her first film role was in Ginger Snaps. Other film credits include White Knuckles (2004), Detention (2003), and If Wishes Were Horses (2002)

Early life
Hampton's professional dance training began at age ten, and performed professionally before entering high school. She continued studying dance, while in high school at Earl Haig Secondary School in Toronto; and then subsequently at the George Randolph Academy.

References

Official web site for Paradise Falls - Contains profile of Danielle Hampton and her character Charlene (Charlie) Piercy.

External links
Danielle Hampton website

Canadian film actresses
Canadian soap opera actresses
Canadian stage actresses
Canadian television actresses
Living people
Year of birth missing (living people)